Petrykozy  is a village in the administrative district of Gmina Żabia Wola, within Grodzisk Mazowiecki County, Masovian Voivodeship, in east-central Poland.

Owners of village 
Aleksander Petrykowski (d. 1672), a Polish nobleman and envoy to Crimea

References

Petrykozy